West Middletown Historic District is a historic district in West Middletown, Pennsylvania.

It is designated as a historic district by the Washington County History & Landmarks Foundation.

References

External links
[ National Register nomination form]

Houses on the National Register of Historic Places in Pennsylvania
Historic districts in Washington County, Pennsylvania
Houses in Washington County, Pennsylvania
Historic districts on the National Register of Historic Places in Pennsylvania
National Register of Historic Places in Washington County, Pennsylvania